KTCO (98.9 FM, "Kat Country 98.9") is a radio station in Duluth, Minnesota, airing a country music format. KTCO is owned by Midwest Communications, which also owns KDKE, WDSM, WDUL, KDAL, and KDAL-FM in Duluth. All the Duluth stations share the same studio location at 11 East Superior St. Suite 380, downtown Duluth.

From 1974 to 1994, this frequency respectively aired Top 40, soft rock, and classic rock, as "99 WAKX." The station originally went on air in 1972 as a beautiful music station, KPIR-FM "Pier 99."

Its main competitor is Townsquare Media's KKCB "B105".

Previous logo

External links
Kat Country 98.9 KTCO official website

Country radio stations in the United States
Radio stations in Duluth, Minnesota
Radio stations established in 1974
Midwest Communications radio stations